Olya Ivanisevic  ( / Olja Ivanišević) (born 28 April 1988) is a Serbian fashion model. She has been on the cover of Italian "Flair" (April 2008), "Marie Claire" (November 2008), "Velvet" (November 2009); and the Serbian Elle (May 2010).

References

External links 
FMD Profile
Olya Fashion spot
Olya Ivanisevic

1988 births
Living people
Models from Belgrade
Serbian female models